The 15th Pan American Games were held in Rio de Janeiro, Brazil from 13 July 2007 to 29 July 2007.

Medals

Bronze

Men's Heavyweight (+ 100 kg): Joel Brutus

Results by event

External links
Rio 2007 Official website

Nations at the 2007 Pan American Games
P
2007